Kawa may refer to:

Places
 Kawa, Myanmar, village in the Bago Region of Myanmar
 Kawa, Sudan, town in ancient Nubia 
 Kawa, Togo, village in the Bimah Prefecture in the Kara Region of north-eastern Togo
 Kawa River, river of Seram Island, Indonesia
 Kawa Township, township in Bago District in the Bago Region of Myanmar

People
 Kawa (surname)
 Kawa Ada (born 1982), Canadian actor, writer and producer
 Kawa Hesso (born 1984), Syrian football player

Others
 Kawa (film) (also known as Nights in the Gardens of Spain), a 2010 New Zealand film
 KAWA (FM), a radio station (89.7 FM) licensed to serve Sanger, Texas, United States
 Kawa (Scheme implementation), a language framework written in Java
 Kawa language
 Kawa or Kawah, other name for the wok

See also
 
 Kahwa, a Kashmiri form of massala chai
 Kava, a plant
 Kāve, mythical figure in Iranian mythology
 Kawakawa (disambiguation)